Nicole Bass (born 1991) is an English television personality, known for appearing in the ITVBe reality series The Only Way Is Essex. In 2017, she appeared in the sixth series of Ex on the Beach.

Career
Bass is a qualified personal trainer. She qualified with Focus Fitness UK in 2019. In October 2015, Nicole joined the cast of the ITVBe reality television series The Only Way is Essex for the sixteenth series. In January 2017, she appeared in the sixth series of Ex on the Beach. In 2019, she was a contestant on MTV's The Challenge. In 2020, it was announced that Bass has rejoined The Only Way Is Essex for the twenty-sixth series.

Filmography

References

1991 births
Living people
Participants in British reality television series
Television personalities from Essex
The Challenge (TV series) contestants